Sheppard v. Maxwell, 384 U.S. 333 (1966), was a United States Supreme Court case that examined a defendant's right to a fair trial as required by the Sixth Amendment and the due process clause of the Fourteenth Amendment. 

In particular, the court sought to determine whether or not Sheppard, the defendant, was denied fair trial for the second-degree murder of his wife, of which he was convicted, because of the trial judge's failure to protect him sufficiently from the massive, pervasive, and prejudicial publicity that attended his prosecution.

Background
After suffering a trial court conviction of second-degree murder for the bludgeoning death of his pregnant wife, Sam Sheppard challenged the verdict as the product of an unfair trial.  Sheppard, who maintained his innocence of the crime, alleged that the trial judge failed to protect him from the massive, widespread, and prejudicial publicity that attended his prosecution. 

An appeal, from the Ohio district court ruling, supported his claim. Then the Sixth Circuit Court of Appeals reversed that decision. 

When Sheppard appealed again, the Supreme Court granted certiorari.

Decision
Justice Clark delivered the opinion of the court:

See also
 F. Lee Bailey
 List of United States Supreme Court cases, volume 384
 Continuance

References

Bibliography
 The Wrong Man: The Final Verdict on the Dr. Sam Sheppard Murder Case (Random House, 2001) ISBN 978-0679457190

External links
 

United States Supreme Court cases
United States Free Speech Clause case law
United States Sixth Amendment jury case law
1966 in United States case law
United States Supreme Court cases of the Warren Court